Starliner may refer to:

 Boeing Starliner, a crew spacecraft
 Ford Starliner (1960–1961), a fastback version of the Ford Galaxie
 Lockheed L-1649 Starliner (1956–1958), an airplane
 Spaceship (disambiguation), analog of jetliner or cruiseliner
 Vega Model 2 Starliner, a 1939 prototype lightplane by Vega Aircraft Corporation
 Studebaker Starliner (1952–1954), a hardtop version of the Studebaker Starlight
 The Starliner, a former roller coaster at Miracle Strip Amusement Park, Panama City Beach, Florida
 "The Starliner", a track from Doctor Who at the BBC Radiophonic Workshop Volume 4: Meglos & Full Circle

See also

 
 
 
 
 Liner (disambiguation)
 Spaceliner (disambiguation)
 Star (disambiguation)
 Starline (disambiguation)
 Starship (disambiguation)